To Life may refer to:

To Life (album), a 1968 album by The Rabbis' Sons
"To Life" (song), song from the 1964 musical Fiddler on the Roof
To Life (film), a 2014 film
To Life, a 1988 Holocaust memoir by Ruth Minsky Sender
Lechaim, Russian Jewish magazine

See also
Haim, a Hebrew name and the popular toast "L'Chaim" ("To life")
Life imprisonment